I.Sat (contraction of the Spanish phrase Imagen Satelital, which means "Satellite image") is an Argentine cable television channel owned by Warner Bros. Discovery International. It airs movies, series, music and shows. It is headquartered in Buenos Aires, Argentina.

It is broadcast on the satellite Intelsat 21 and is carried by most cable television companies in Argentina, Brazil, Bolivia, Chile, Colombia, Ecuador, Mexico, Panama, Paraguay, Peru, Uruguay, and Venezuela.

Recent history
Until 2007, the channel was owned by "Claxson Interactive Group Latin America & Iberia" (which was a subsidiary of the Venezuelan-based Grupo Cisneros) but that year the channel, along with Retro and Space, is bought by Turner Broadcasting System. It aired different programming on different blocks, such as "Primer Plano I.Sat" (foreign movies), "Cine Argentino Independiente" (independent Argentine films), "Asian Connection" (Asian films), and "Cortos I-Sat" (short films).

In 2007 it changed its programming from being a 24-hour movies channel to have movies, series, shows, documentary series, music and some others. Some current programming includes Little Britain, Raising Hope, Misfits, and others.

Adult Swim, which previously aired on Cartoon Network, aired every night with adult animation series since 2007 after its cancellation from Cartoon Network; however, the Adult Swim block was cancelled from I.Sat on 2010 due to low ratings. Adult Swim however returned to I.Sat on April 3, 2015 until April 16, 2020.

Logos

Programming

Current programming blocks
Cine Argentino Independiente: Argentine independent films.
Cortos I.Sat: Short films.
Cuentos de terror. Horror stories narrated by Alberto Laiseca.
I.Films: Featured movies with monthly premieres.
I.Series: Series, shows and reality series.
Primer Plano I-Sat: International Independent films.

Former programming blocks 
Adult Swim: Previously aired on Cartoon Network.  It aired cartoons and anime series for adults since 2007. Discontinued in 2010. Returned in April 2015 until April 2020.
Asian Connection: Asian films.
BritTV: British shows and series from BBC and Channel 4.
Comedy Central. Programming block with series from the TV channel Comedy Central. Discontinued in 2004.
Cine Zeta. Films with poor ratings or reviews. Discontinued in 2005.
Furia Oriental: Anime series and Asian films.
Sexorama. Softcore films. Discontinued in 2008.

Foreign programming
Adventure Time (Lasted only two hours in the special "Happy birthday Cartoon Network" on April 21, 2013)
Alice
Angel
Arrested Development
As If
Bewitched
Black Mirror
The Brady Bunch
Buffy the Vampire Slayer
Californication
Carnivàle
Cha Cha Cha
Come Fly with Me
Cock'd Gunns
Dharma and Greg
Diff'rent Strokes
Episodes
Extras
The Facts of Life
Gimme a Break!
Happy Days
I Dream of Jeannie
Late Night with Conan O'Brien
Little Britain
Loaded
Laverne & Shirley
MADtv
Neon Genesis Evangelion
Peep Show
Pippalotta's Home
Raising Hope
Regular Show (I.Sat aired the episode "The Graveyard" uncensored on November 22, 2013, in its special "Ani-Mes" in "Cortos I.Sat")
Rosie
Rubicon
Running Wilde
Secret Diary of a Call Girl
Shameless
Shameless (U.S. version)
Six Feet Under
Sound
Sugar Rush
The Basement Sessions
The Borgias
The IT Crowd
The Mighty Boosh
The Mind of the Married Man
The Office
The Whitest Kids U' Know
Trigger Happy TV
Trust Me
Veronica Mars

External links
Official Site
Official YouTube Channel

References

Latin American cable television networks
Portuguese-language television stations in Brazil
Spanish-language television stations
Television channels and stations established in 1993
Television in Argentina
Television stations in Argentina
Warner Bros. Discovery Americas
Warner Bros. Discovery networks